The 2005 Women's NORCECA Volleyball Championship was the 19th edition of the Women's Continental Volleyball Tournament, played by eight countries from September 6 to September 11, 2005 in Port of Spain, Trinidad and Tobago. The United States won the event over Cuba and qualified for the 2005 Women's Volleyball Grand Champions Cup, later that year in Japan. Barbados and Trinidad & Tobago were the newcomers to this competition. The Dominican Republic won the bronze medal and Nancy Metcalf was awarded Most Valuable Player.

Competing nations

Squads

Preliminary round

Group A

September 6

September 7

September 8

Group B

September 6

September 7

September 8

Final round

Quarter-finals
September 9

Semi-finals
September 10

Finals
September 9 — Seventh Place Match

September 10 — Fifth Place Match

September 11 — Bronze Medal Match

September 11 — Gold Medal Match

Final ranking

The United States qualified for the 2005 Women's Volleyball Grand Champions Cup

Awards

Most Valuable Player
  Nancy Metcalf

Best Scorer
  Tayyiba Haneef

Best Setter
  Lindsey Berg

Best Spiker
  Zoila Barros

Best Blocker
  Cindy Rondón
Best Defender
  Annie Levesque

Best Server
  Nancy Carrillo

Best Libero
  Alexandra Caso

Best Receiver
  Aury Cruz

References

External links
 Results 

Women's NORCECA Volleyball Championship
N
N
Volleyball
2005 in Caribbean sport